The giant bully (Gobiomorphus gobioides), tītarakura, or tīpokopoko (Māori), is a species of fish in the family Eleotridae endemic to New Zealand. Adults are generally found near the coast in freshwater, tidal or estuarine habitats. The breeding behavior is poorly known, but the species is considered diadromous and it is suspected that the larvae spend time in the sea.

It is very similar to the common bully (which can reach up to ), but it has six dorsal spines, where the common bully usually has seven.

References

giant bully
Endemic freshwater fish of New Zealand
Taxa named by Achille Valenciennes
giant bully